Manushi: A Journal about Women and Society is an Indian magazine devoted to feminism as well as to gender studies and activism. The magazine was founded in 1978 by Madhu Kishwar and Ruth Vanita, two scholars based in New Delhi. It is currently published as a bi-monthly; a total of 157 issues have appeared by the end of the year 2006. Manushi is also a publishing house which prints not just works on the status of women in India but also novels and short stories with a less direct connection to gender issues.

Manushi from the beginning has sought to publish articles about the full range of South Asian communities. It regularly includes articles about women's issues in Pakistan, Nepal, Bangladesh and Sri Lanka as well as less frequent articles from around the world. The editors strive to cover people often relatively ignored in English-language media in South Asia. Activists are asked to contribute articles about peasants, workers and minorities, whether religious or ethnic. Manushi sponsors series of lectures and training seminars and also furnishes information to victimised women.

References

 Kishwar, Madhu and Vanita, Ruth (eds.). In search of Answers: Indian Women's voices from Manushi. (First edition 1984, various reprints and revised editions by Indian and British publishers between 1985 and 1999.)

External links
 

1978 establishments in Delhi
English-language magazines published in India
Feminism and society
Feminist magazines
Feminism in India
Women's magazines published in India
Magazines established in 1978
Magazines published in Delhi
Women's rights in Asia
Bi-monthly magazines published in India